The regions of Albaniaapart from the official present and historical administrative divisionsinclude the following:

Divisions

There are two major ethnographical regions of Albania, at each side of the Shkumbin river – North Albania or Ghegeria in the north (Gheg Albanians) and South Albania or Toskeria in the south (Tosk Albanians).

 Coastal Albania
 Northeast Albanian
 Southeast Albanian

Albanian Wikipedia

The Albanian Wikipedia lists the following regions
 :sq:Rajoni Juglindor The region of the south east.
 :sq:Nenrajoni Verilindor Other regions in the northeast.
 :sq:Rajoni perëndimor i Shqipërisë Western region of Albania
 :sq:/Ultësira_Perëndimore_e_Shqipërisë Western Lowlands of Albania

The main article :sq:Gjeografia e Shqipërisë mentions the following logical divisions.
 Alpet shqiptare (Albanian Alps)
 Krahina malore qendrorere,  (The hill country in the center)
 Ultesira bregdetare (Coastal lowlands)

Coastal Albania

Cities
 Kavaje
 Fier
 Lezhë
 Sarandë
 Shengjin
 Vlorë

Popular cities

 Elbasan
 Durrës

Cities
 Elbasan
 Tirana The capital
 Durrës (is also coastal)
 Kavaja
 Shkoder

Northeast Albania 
Shqipëri Verilindore

Cities
 Bajram Curri
 Kruje
 Kukës
 Peshkopi
 mut

Mountains
 Dajt
 Gjallica
 Maja Jezercë
 Korab
 Maja e Malësores
 Maja e Moravës

Southeast Albania

Cities
 Berat
 Gjirokastër
 Korce
 Librazhd
 Kuçovë
 Permet
 Pogradec
 Tepelena

Mountains
 Gramos
 Mali i Thatë
 Nemerçkë
 Ostrovicë
 Tomorr

See also
 Greater Albania

References